Enes Mahmutovic (born 22 May 1997) is a Luxembourgish professional footballer who plays as a centre-back for CSKA Sofia.

Club career
In the summer of 2014, Mahmutovic signed his first professional senior contract with CS Fola Esch.

On 19 May 2017, it was announced that he had joined Championship club Middlesbrough for an undisclosed fee. Mahmutovic made his debut for the club on 14 August 2018, in an EFL Cup tie with Notts County, scoring a headed goal in the 3–3 draw. In doing so, he became the first Luxembourger in history to score a professional goal in English football.

On 30 August 2018, Mahmutovic joined League Two club Yeovil Town on loan until the end of the season. His time at Yeovil Town was cut short on 31 December 2018, with Mahmutovic returning early to Middlesbrough upon the opening of the January transfer window after only playing a limited role at the League Two side.

On 1 July 2019, Mahmutovic joined MVV Maastricht of the Dutch Eerste Divisie, going on to appear 16 times for the club across the season.

Middlesbrough announced that Mahmutovic had been released by the club on 28 June 2020.

On 31 March 2022, Mahmutovic signed a contract with Bulgarian club CSKA Sofia.

International career
Mahmutovic was born in Peć, FR Yugoslavia, and moved to Luxembourg at a young age. He was eligible for Montenegro and Luxembourg internationally, as well as Kosovo or Serbia, his birthplace. He made his international debut for Luxembourg on 13 November 2016, in a 1–3 loss to the Netherlands.

Career statistics

Club

International

References

1997 births
Living people
Sportspeople from Peja
Association football defenders
Kosovan footballers
Luxembourgian footballers
Luxembourg international footballers
CS Fola Esch players
Middlesbrough F.C. players
Yeovil Town F.C. players
MVV Maastricht players
FC Lviv players
PFC CSKA Sofia players
First Professional Football League (Bulgaria) players
Luxembourg National Division players
English Football League players
Eerste Divisie players
Ukrainian Premier League players
Luxembourgian expatriate footballers
Expatriate footballers in England
Luxembourgian expatriate sportspeople in England
Expatriate footballers in the Netherlands
Luxembourgian expatriate sportspeople in the Netherlands
Expatriate footballers in Ukraine
Luxembourgian expatriate sportspeople in Ukraine
Expatriate footballers in Bulgaria
Luxembourg under-21 international footballers